Jillian is both a feminine given name and a surname. A spelling variant of Gillian, it originates as  a feminine form of the given name Julian, Julio, Julius, and Julien.

Notable people with the name include:

Given name
 Jillian Armenante (born 1968), American television and film actress
 Jillian Rose Banks (born 1988), American musical artist
 Jillian Becker (born 1932), South African novelist
 Jillian Bell (born 1984), American comedian, actress, and screenwriter
 Jillian Camarena-Williams (born 1982), American shot putter
 Jillian D'Alessio (born 1985), Canadian kayaker
 Jillian Mai Thi Epperly (born c. 1973/4), creator of Jilly Juice
 Jillian Evans (born 1959), Welsh politician
 Jillian Grace (born 1985), American model
 Jillian Hall (born 1980), American professional wrestler
 Jillian Hunter, American author
 Jillian Keiley, Canadian director
 Jillian Kesner-Graver (1950–2007), American actress and historian
 Jillian Kraus (born 1986), American water polo player
 Jillian McDonald, Canadian artist
 Jillian Medoff (born 1963), American writer
 Jillian Michaels (born 1974), American exercise instructor
 Jillian Murray (born 1989), American actress and model
 Jillian Parry Fry (born 1982), Miss Teen USA 2000
 Jillian Reynolds (born 1966), Canadian actress
 Jillian Richardson (born 1965), Canadian athlete
 Jillian Skinner (born 1944), Australian politician
 Jillian Smith (born 1958), New Zealand field hockey player
 Jillian Speer (born 1979), American acoustic guitarist
 Jillian Ward (born 2005), FIlipina actress, model and singer
 Jillian Wheeler (born 1991), American singer-songwriter and actress
 Jillian Whiting, Australian journalist

Surname
 Ann Jillian (born 1950), American actress

See also

 Jillian's, a restaurant and arcade chain
 Jillian (I'd Give My Heart), a song and single by Within Temptation
 Gillian

Feminine given names